Raúl Gómez Ramírez (29 May 1964 – 10 December 2014) was a Mexican politician affiliated with the PAN. He served as a deputy in the LXII Legislature of the Mexican Congress, representing the tenth district of Guanajuato.

On 16 November 2014 Gómez was involved in a traffic accident near Celaya, Guanajuato. He died from injuries related to the accident on 10 December.

References

1964 births
2014 deaths
Politicians from Guanajuato
National Action Party (Mexico) politicians
Road incident deaths in Mexico
21st-century Mexican politicians
Members of the Chamber of Deputies (Mexico) for Guanajuato